Sharpe's Fury is the eleventh historical novel in the Richard Sharpe series by Bernard Cornwell, published in 2006. The story is set in 1811 during Wellington's campaign in the Iberian peninsula.

Plot summary
In the spring of 1811, the Peninsular War appears to have been won by the French. Cádiz is the only major Spanish town still holding out. From their overwintering strongholds in Portugal, the British sally forth to the River Guadiana with a small force seeking to destroy a key bridge across the river. The mission is commanded by the young Brigadier General Moon, a man with no love for Sharpe. Sharpe and the men with him encounter French Colonel Henri Vandal, commander of the 8th Regiment of the Line. Sharpe succeeds in blowing up the bridge. Sharpe, Harper, Moon and some the 95 are stranded on a plontoon which sails down stream. Once they have landed further down stream they meet up with some of Connaught rangers who help Sharpe keep the French at bay for the time being. After resting for a while Sharpe and the others try and find a way to get to the Anglo-Portuguese armies again. After walking for a while they find a house and take shelter. Sharpe is able to find a boat that could lead the small company to the British in Lisbon. The marquesa that takes them in is an afrancesada, Sharpe realising this gets the company to the boat and is able to set off but is pursued by the French which have travelled down stream using the rest of the plontoons. The French and Sharpes men have brief skirmish but the men are able to set off. A stray musket ball bits Sharpe in the head seriously injuring him. His men manage to get him to Cádiz, which is besieged by a French army led by Marshal Victor.

In Cadiz, British ambassador Henry Wellesley, younger brother to the Duke of Wellington, seeks Sharpe's help. Wellesley has fallen in love with a beautiful woman named Caterina Blazquez. Unfortunately, she turns out to be a whore, and her pimp tries to blackmail Wellesley using Wellesley's love letters. Worse, virulently anti-British Catholic priest Father Salvador Montseny learns of this and murders the pimp to obtain the letters. British spymaster Lord Pumphrey assures Wellesley he can pay for the letters and that will be the end of the affair, but Sharpe believes otherwise. Sharpe is proved correct, but eventually manages to steal the letters (and make the acquaintance of Blazquez) with the assistance of Patrick Harper and his trusted riflemen.

Then a joint Spanish-British army is transported by boat south of the city to attack Victor's forces from the rear and lift the siege. Because the Spanish provide more troops, timid Spanish General Lapena is given command, rather than British General Thomas Graham. Lapena squanders opportunity after opportunity, leading his men toward disaster and Victor's trap. Fortunately, Graham and the British, fighting desperately while the Spanish do nothing, defeat the French in the Battle of Barrosa. In the battle, Sharpe captures Colonel Vandal.

Release details
2006, UK, HarperCollins , Pub date 28 August 2006, hardback (First edition)

References

External links
Section from Bernard Cornwell's website on Sharpe's Fury

2006 British novels
Fury
Fiction set in 1811
Novels set in the 1810s
Peninsular War
HarperCollins books